Graham Alexander Ingerson (born 27 August 1941) is a former Australian politician and 8th Deputy Premier of South Australia from 1996 to 1998. Ingerson was a Liberal Party member of the House of Assembly seat of Bragg between 1983 and 2002.

Career 
Ingerson held portfolios including Minister for Tourism and Industrial Affairs, Minister for Recreation, Sport and Racing, Minister for Infrastructure, Minister for Police, Minister for Emergency Service, Minister for Racing, Minister for Local Government, Minister for Industry, Trade and Tourism, and Cabinet Secretary (not a Ministerial position).

In August 1998, Ingerson resigned from the ministry over his handling of the racing industry. He was promoted again to Cabinet Secretary in February 2000, but had to resign that in October 2001, over his handling of the Hindmarsh Soccer Stadium. The Opposition described the stadium development as a "41 million dollar white elephant."

Post-parliamentary career 
As of 2016, Ingerson is a registered political lobbyist in the state of South Australia. Notable interests he represents include the Australian Maritime and Fishing Academy, the supermarket chains Foodland, IGA and Romeos,  Clean Seas Seafood (listed as The Stehr Group of Companies) and ASX-listed mining company, Terramin.

References

External links
 Parliament Profile
 Poll Bludger profile
 Ingerson resignation - SA soccer scandal
 Ingerson resignation - damage control

|-

|-

1941 births
Living people
Deputy Premiers of South Australia
Members of the South Australian House of Assembly
Liberal Party of Australia members of the Parliament of South Australia
21st-century Australian politicians